Stadion pod Golubinjom is a multi-use stadium in Pljevlja, Montenegro. It is used mostly for football matches and is the home ground of FK Rudar Pljevlja. Also, local clubs FK Pljevlja and women football club Breznica use this stadium. The stadium holds 5,140 seating places. On the east stands FK Rudar is written, and on the west stands Pljevlja, by red and blue chairs, which are the colors of the club.

External links
 Stadium information 

Football venues in Montenegro
FK Rudar Pljevlja
Sport in Pljevlja